The Pennsylvania Railroad's steam locomotive class D4 (formerly Class C (anthracite), pre-1895) comprised thirty-seven anthracite-burning 4-4-0 locomotives intended for general passenger and freight service on the PRR's New Jersey lines, constructed at the railroad's own Altoona Works (now owned by Norfolk Southern) during 1873–1890.
They shared many parts with other standard classes.

This design differed from the Class C (later D3) mainly in its longer firebox to burn slower-burning anthracite coal.  Like all the early standardized 4-4-0s on the PRR, the Class C (Anthracite) had a wagon-top boiler with steam dome and a firebox between the two driving axles.

In 1875, fifteen locomotives were either built or converted (sources differ) with  drivers for fast passenger service on the New Jersey lines.  These were classified Class CA (Anthracite) or later D4a, and handled this traffic until 1881, when they were replaced by heavier power.

References

4-4-0 locomotives
D04
Railway locomotives introduced in 1873
Scrapped locomotives
Standard gauge locomotives of the United States
Steam locomotives of the United States